T. G. Venkatraman (2 February 1931 – 21 February 2013) was an Indian politician who was a member of the D.M.K. Party.

Early life
Tindivanam G. Venkatraman was born in Tindivanam, in Villupuram district on 2 February 1931. His father was Shri V. Gopala Gounder. He belonged to the Vanniyar Gounder community. He married Smt. V. Vasantha on 8 May 1960 and had three sons and one daughter. He gained a B.A. degree at Annamalai University, Chidambaram and a B.L. at Law College, Madras University, Madras (Tamil Nadu).

He worked as Junior Advocate with Late Mr. Narayanasami Mudaliar (former Law Minister of Tamil Nadu) at chennai and later was practicing as an advocate at Tindivanam and throughout South Arcot district.

He died on 21 February 2013 at the age of 82.

Political life
He was a D.M.K. party member and activist. Contested for Legislative Assembly Elections in 1977 for D.M.K and lost to T.R. Erajaram Reddy INC.

He was elected to the Rajya Sabha in 1989 and served till 1995. He contested for the Lok Sabha elections representing D.M.K and got elected to the eleventh Lok Sabha in 1996, defeating his nearest rival Mr. Tindivanam. K. Ramamurthy (INC) with a whooping margin of 190, 276 votes. He was appointed Union Cabinet Minister of Surface Transport (Independent charge).

Positions held

1978–85	Member, General Council, D.M.K.
1989-95	Elected to Rajya Sabha
1989–90	Member, Consultative Committee, Ministry of Textiles
1990–91	Member, Consultative Committee, Ministry of Steel and Mines
1992–94	Member, Committee on Petitions
1993–94	Member, Committee on Subordinate Legislation
1996-98        Elected to Lok Sabha (Eleventh)
1996-98        Union Cabinet Minister, Surface Transport

Social and Cultural Activities
Member, Trust Board for Vannia Kula Kshatriya Thirumana Mandapam, 1980 onwards; 
donor for a prize to backward class students in Govt. Arts College, Tindivanam, 1980 onwards

References

India MPs 1996–1997
1931 births
2013 deaths
Annamalai University alumni
Dravida Munnetra Kazhagam politicians
Lok Sabha members from Tamil Nadu
People from Viluppuram district
Rajya Sabha members from Tamil Nadu
Union Ministers from Tamil Nadu
University of Madras alumni